The 2021 season was Beijing Guoan F.C.'s 57th season in football competition and the club's 18th consecutive season in the Chinese Super League since the league's founding in the 2004. It was the team's 31st consecutive season in the top flight of Chinese football. It covered a period from 1 January 2021 to 4 January 2022.

Summary

Pre-season 
On 2 January, Toni Šunjić completed his transfer to Henan Jianye, the team he played for on loan after he was signed by Guoan in the summer of 2020. He did not cap for Guoan.

On 6 January, Guoan announced Slaven Bilić, former manager of the Croatian national team, West Ham United and West Bromwich Albion as the team's new manager. The team's contract with former manager Bruno Génésio lapsed at the end of the last season and was not renewed.

22 January saw Kim Min-Jae arrive in Guangzhou to begin his COVID-19 quarantine according to Chinese government regulations amid transfer rumors. He was the first foreign player to return ahead of the season. Bilić and his coaching staff landed in Hangzhou on 25 January for quarantine. Guoan's first training camp for the season began on 25 January in Kunming with only 11 first team players as many foreign players have yet to return or were undergoing quarantine according to Chinese regulations, and 7 first team members were training with the Chinese national team in Haikou. Chinese coaching staff led the training camp alongside reserve team players. The training camp ended on 9 February, and the team will regroup in Haikou for the next training camp after their lunar new year break.

On 8 February, the Asian Football Confederation announced that fellow CSL club Shandong Taishan was banned from this season's AFC Champions League due to finance-related violations. Guoan therefore no longer need to participate in the play-off round as it is set to take Shandong's spot in the group stage proper.

Guoan announced the singing of Cao Yongjing from Beijing Renhe on 9 February. He chose the number 37 shirt.

15 February saw Guoan regroup for its second winter training camp in Haikou. Players previously training with the Chinese national team have returned, and Bilić, along with his coaching staff, have completed the required quarantine and led the training sessions.

On 16 February, Guoan announced the signing of Gao Tianyi from Jiangsu. He was given the number 15 shirt. Guoan announced the transfer of Zhang Yu to Changchun Yatai on 25 February. Further, Dongda He joined from the U23 team at Wolverhampton Wanderers on 26 February. He will be wearing number 28.

Bakambu returned to China on 2 March while the return date of Augusto, Viera and Fernando remains uncertain. On 5 March, Bakambu announced via his personal social media accounts that he has tested for COVID-19. Guoan released a statement later, confirming that Bakambu is without symptoms and currently receiving treatment.

The team concluded its Hainan training camp on 5 March, having won three friendlies against teams training locally. Head coach Bilić, recounting the training camp, said that he was satisfied with "the weather, the pitch, the training facility as well as the players' mentality." "We have a bright future," commented Bilić on the talent of the Guoan reserve team that trained with the first team.

The team's third training camp began in Shanghai on 11 March and concluded on 25 March. The fourth training camp and the last before the beginning of the season on 20 April began on 30 March. Bakambu, fully recovered, joined the training along with Viera, who returned to China mid-March and completed his quarantine.

The Chinese FA announced the competition format for this season's Chinese Super League on 1 April. There will be three stages, with the first stage seeing participating teams divided into two groups competing in Guangzhou and Suzhou respectively. Guoan is placed into group B alongside Shanghai Port, Shanghai Shenhua and Wuhan amongst other teams and will compete in Suzhou.

On 10 April, Guoan announced the loan of Lucas Souza from Changchun Yatai and the singing of Bai Yang.

Name change 
On 14 December 2020, the Chinese Football Association officially mandated that all clubs must remove references to investors and the companies that own them in their name and instead adopt "neutral" names before the beginning of the 2021 season. Under this regulation, Guoan need to drop Sinobo, a Chinese real estate investment company and the club's majority owner, from its name. Further, the club must change its name, Guoan, as CITIC Guoan Group still owns partial share in the club.

The club, its owners, and its fans have objected the name change as all parties feel the name "Guoan" is part of the club's identity. All clubs must submit their new name to the Chinese FA for approval by 31 December 2020; instead of submitting a new name, Guoan submitted a petition to delay name change on the grounds that Sinobo Group is negotiating a deal to purchase the club's remaining shares from CITIC Guoan. If the purchase is completed, the name "Guoan" will no longer directly reference the club's owner, which may avert the need for a new club name.

On 21 January, reports emerged that the Chinese FA demanded Guoan to show concrete proof of the purchase negotiation process by 31 January, otherwise the club must adopt a different name for the upcoming season. Further difficulties during the purchase negotiations process was reported on 26 January. The report claims that due to CITIC being a Chinese state-owned enterprise, ownership transfer requires a more complicated process, and that the parties involved could not agree over the transaction cost.

On 29 January, the China Beijing Equity Exchange published a notice outlining the club's intended ownership transfer from CITIC to Sinobo for ￥1, successfully meeting Chinese FA's 31 January deadline. However, reports emerged on 3 February that the ownership transfer would require Sinobo to shoulder an additional debt of ￥600 million, stalling the transfer and increasingly the likelihood that the club would have to take up a new name.

During a television interview with CCTV reporter Bai Yansong on 19 March, the president of Chinese FA Chen Xuyuan stated that it is likely for Guoan to keep its name provided the ownership transfer occurs without incident.

On 25 March, the club's name changed from "Beijing Sinobo Guoan" to "Beijing Guoan" according to official company registration database, signaling a high likelihood that the name "Guoan" is compliant with relevant Chinese FA regulations and hence marked an end of the name change saga.

The ownership transfer process was completed on 21 June according to an official club statement, making Sinobo Group the sole owner of the club. The club name "Guoan" is kept.

April 
On 23 April, Guoan suffered a resounding defeat against Shanghai Shenhua in the season opener. Despite having 67% possession, the team struggled against taller opposition strikers, and managed only 6 shots in comparison to Shenhua's 14. After a first half with highlights from both sides, Shenhua's Moreno broke the deadlock on the 59th minute with a header at the end of a corner situation, which Guoan defended haphazardly throughout the game. Wu Xi added another for Shenhua in the 65th with a strike at the edge of the penalty area. In the 91st minute, Li Ke advanced the ball up the pitch from the right flank before threading it across the opposition penalty area; Li Lei slipped the ball passed Shenhua's keeper for a consolation goal. The game ended as a 2–1 loss for Guoan.

Guoan suffered a 3–1 defeat against Shanghai Port on Matchday 2 on 28 April. Head coach Bilić attempted a new tactic by selecting a three-defender backline with the hopes of increasing aggression and allowing for more players to join the attack, but the experiment failed as Shanghai Port's Lopes scored a quickfire double inside the first four minutes of the game. Guoan pulled a goal back in the 21st minute with a quick counter attack that originated from a Gao Tianyi and ended with Viera sliding the ball past Port's keeper off a Bakambu through ball assist. Cao Yongjing came on for Li Lei at the beginning of the second half as Guoan continued to push for a second goal, and Souza made his debut for the team in the 78th minute replacing injured defender Kim Min-Jae. However, Guoan's positive momentum was undone in the 80th minute as Port's Lü Wenjun scored a header. With two consecutive losses, Guoan suffered its worst start of any CSL campaign since the league's conception. Guoan has not lost two games in a row at the start of the season since 2000, when the team played in the Chinese Jia-A League under head coach Milovan Đorić, who was fired after losing the opening three games.

May 
Guoan's first victory of the season came when they defeated Dalian Pro 2–0 on 4 May on Matchday 3. First half saw action from both sides but neither were able to score a goal. Viera was substituted for injury in the 39th minute and was sent to a local hospital at halftime for evaluation from what appeared to be a serious knee injury. Guoan grabbed the lead in the 52nd minute with Zhang Xizhe powering a Zhang Yuning cross from the left flank into the box past the opposition keeper. Two minutes later, Zhang Xizhe scored an almost identical goal, except with his head this time, from a similar movement. Li Lei provided the assist. The second yellow card for opposition player Tong Lei in the 73rd minute sealed the win for Guoan. Viera was diagnosed with right knee MCL and meniscus injury the next day and is expected to miss several games.

Kim Min-jae temporarily left the team on 9 May due to a family member suffering from serious health problem. Adding to the misfortune, Bilić reported on the same day during the pre-match press conference against Wuhan that defender Yu Yang suffered a rib fracture and will be sidelined for extended periods.

The injury-riddled Guoan played Wuhan on Matchday 4 on 10 May. Zhang Yuning drew an early penalty in the 3rd minute which Bakambu prompted converted. The two combined again in the 46th minute to score Guoan's second goal of the game with Bakambu following through a deflected shot from Zhang. Despite failing to won a single corner, Guoan held the 0–2 lead to the end of the game. The match also marked Li Lei's 100th appearance for the club. With multiple players receiving call-ups from the Chinese national team, the Matchday 5 game against Hebei is postponed until a later date, giving the team a 40-day break. AFC also announced on the same day that this season's Champions League group stage games for group H and I, which includes Guoan, will be played in Uzbekistan between 25 June and 11 July.

The team regrouped on 20 May in Beijing and began preparation for the next stage of CSL competitions. Piao Cheng joined the whole team in training for the first time after recovering from a torn ACL suffered on 1 August 2020.

June 
Due to complications regarding China's COVID-19 quarantine rules for foreigners and COVID cases discovered within the Maldives and Syrian national teams, the venue for China's remaining second round matches in the 2022 World Cup Asian qualification was moved from China to the UAE. The travel and the subsequent mandatory quarantine requirements upon return meant that it was extremely unlikely for the CSL, scheduled to resume on 21 June, to proceed as planned after the national team's game on 15 June. Although no official announcement has been made, the absence of CSL matches on their planned dates signifies that the league is currently delayed.

On 18 June, Guoan's AFC Champions League squad traveled to Uzbekistan ahead of the upcoming group stage games. Due to overlapping schedule with the CSL and the Chinese government's mandatory 14-day quarantine after returning from a foreign country, Guoan's team consisted mostly of reserve squad players. The 21-player squad included four younger first-team players, Guo Quanbo, Li Boxi, Xie Longfei and Jiang Wenhao, and the average age is only 20.9 years. Zoran Janković, the reserve team head coach, served as the manager.

Guoan's young players stood the test in the first game of Group I against United City on 26 June. Despite conceding in the 28th minute, generating only 3 shots in comparison to the opponent's 19, and retaining only 26% of total possession, Liang Shaowen managed to bend a free kick past the opposition goalkeeper to tie the game 1–1 in the 73rd minute from a foul committed to stop Naibijiang's dribble. Guoan thus avoided a loss and earned a precious point, rising to third in the group. Liang, at 19 years and 14 days, became the youngest Guoan player to score in an AFC Champions League game; Ma Yujun became the youngest Guoan player to feature in a Champions League game at 18 years and 131 days.

The youngsters, however, were outclassed by reigning J1 League champion Kawasaki Frontale in the second group stage game on 29 June. Unbeaten in over seven months in all competitions, Kawasaki netted 7 times with 6 different players in 56 minutes with Guoan failing to score. The 0–7 loss marked the largest defeat suffered by a Chinese club in AFC Champions League history.

July 
In the third AFC Champions League group stage game against K League 1 club Daegu FC, Guoan's youngsters put up a fair fight in the early minutes. Leng Jixuan dragged a shot just wide of the goal in the 10th minute, and Gao Jian managed to hit the post in the 13th. The young players, however, were unsuccessful in defending the 22 shots Daegu generated over the course of the entire match, eventually losing 0–5.

In the second match-up against Daegu on 5 July, the inexperienced Guoan lost 0–3 despite a defense-first approach. The last opposition goal came as a result of Liang Shaowen deflecting the ball into Guoan's own net. With only one point after four matches, it became impossible for Guoan to advance to the elimination phase of this season's AFC Champions League. On the same day, the Chinese FA also announced schedule changes to the Super League and the Chinese FA Cup. The CSL calendar is shortened to 22 matchdays from the original 30. The top four teams from Group A and B respectively after 14 matchdays will qualify for the championship group, which will consist of 8 matchdays as the teams from one group play only the teams from the other group twice. The winner of the championship group will be crowned as champions. The first CSL stage will resume on 15 July and is scheduled to end on 12 August, and the championship stage will take place between 1 December 2021 and 3 January 2022. Further, Guoan is now scheduled to join the 2021 Chinese FA Cup in the first round beginning on 16 October along with 31 other teams. All rounds will be single-elimination except for the semi-finals, in which two games will be play between the competing teams.

Guoan faced United City for their second matchup in the AFC Champions League group stage on 8 July. Jiang Wenhao fired a shot passed the opposition keeper after only 39 seconds, and Leng Jixuan doubled Guoan's lead 3 minutes later cutting inside from the right flank and rounding the opposition defender and goalkeeper. Guoan failed to maintain the advantage, however, in the second half, giving up two goals from free kick situations and one more from a rapid counted directly after Leng Jixuan hit the post. Guoan lost the game 2–3, slipping to last place in the group with five games played. 

In the final group match game against Kawasaki Frontale on 11 July, Guoan conceded two goals in each half, losing the game 0–4.

Guoan re-signed Jiang Tao, whose contract with the club ended at the end of the previous season but has failed to secure a new club, on 13 July ahead of the upcoming compact CSL schedule that will see Guoan play a match every three days for a month. His old shirt number 28 was taken and he has thus opted for number 29.

Guoan returned to league action on 16 July against Hebei. Both team traded chances as the heavy rain disrupted the ball movement in first half, but neither were able to score. The deadlock was broken in the 51st minute with Zhang Yuning converting a penalty won by himself after an over-the-top Chi Zhongguo pass into the penalty area forced the opposition goalkeeper to commit a foul. Guoan doubled the lead in the 83rd minute after Zhang Xizhe scored another penalty from a foul committed on Yu Dabao as he lunged forward to contest a loose ball in the box. The eventual 2–1 victory helped the team move up to second in Group A. Three days later, Guoan played Tianjin Jinmen Tiger in the CSL. Despite 20 shots with 8 on target, Guoan drew the match 0–0.

On 22 July, vice-captain Renato Augusto's contract was terminated via mutual consent as he was unable to return to China due to China's COVID-19 restrictions. He bid farewell to the club via a heart-warming message on his personal Instagram account. Considering his time at the club "a privilege," he went on to thank the players, staff and fans. Since his arrival in January 2016, he capped for the club 152 times, scoring 40 and assisting another 45; he was a crucial part of the 2019 team that won the Chinese FA cup. He signed with Corinthians on the same day. Later in the day, Guoan lost 0–2 to Changchun Yatai in the CSL despite almost 70% possession. Piao Cheng, injured since August 2020, made his first competitive debut this season.

Guoan resumed their CSL campaign on 28 July against Shanghai Port after the matchday 8 game against Shanghai Shenhua was delayed to August due to inclement weather caused by Typhoon In-fa. In the 60th minute, Li Lei's mistimed challenge allowed the opposition a series of passes on the left side that eventually resulted in a goal. Searching for more directness, Bilić pushed Yu Dabao, who started the game as a center-back, to the front. This change eventually led to Yu scoring a header in the 88th minute at the end of a Li Lei cross. The game ended in a 1–1 draw.

On 30 July, Guoan signed Anderson Silva from Famalicão in the Primeira Liga. A day later, Souza left the team as his loan expired. The same day saw Guoan play Dalian in the CSL. After a scrappy first half, Piao won a penalty in the 73rd minute following a set piece situation. Bakambu converted the penalty and helped Guoan secure the 1–0 victory, snapping a three-game winless streak for the team.

August 
The first game in August was against Wuhan on 3 August. Bakambu scored two early goals for Guoan: sending the keeper the wrong way after a long through ball from Gao Tianyi in the 15th minute, and tapping in a Zhang Yuning pullback in the 20th. Both Bakambu and Zhang Yuning had open looks in the second half, but neither was able to convert their chances. Guoan conceded in the 67th minute from a set piece situation as the ball slipped in Hou Sen's hands, but held on well against a late Wuhan surge and ended the game with a 2–1 victory. In the 6 August game against Hebei, goalkeeper Hou Sen put on a magnificent performance and denied the opposition multiple scoring chances. However, Guoan failed to convert its own chances towards the end of the game after a passive first hour, ending the match in a 0–0 draw.

Turkish club Fenerbahçe announced on 7 August via their official Twitter account that it entered contract negotiations with Kim Min-jae and had scheduled a medical with him on 8 August in Turkey, essentially solidifying the immediate departure of the Korean international. The transfer was made official on 13 August according to an official club announcement via social media. On 9 August, Guoan suffered a resounding 3–1 defeat at the hands of Tianjin Jinme Tiger. Bilić opted for a rotation in the game, sitting Li Lei, Wang Gang and Yu Dabao and instead named Liu Huan, Jiang Tao and Bai Yang in the starting eleven. After conceding in the 33rd minute, Bilić substituted the starters back on in an attempt to bolster midfield control and strengthen the attack. This attempt led to a Zhang Yuning goal from a floated cross by Gao Tianyi in the 64th minute. However, Yang Fan failed to deal with an opposition player breaking through on Guoan's right flank, leading to a second opposition goal. In a chaotic ending minutes, both Guoan's Chi Zhongguo and Tianjin's Bai Yuefeng received straight reds, and Guoan conceded again after Li Lei was forced to give a penalty to stop an opposition attack. Guoan fell to 5th in Group A  after the loss.

Guoan played Changchun Yatai on 12 August in the second to last matchday of the CSL qualification stage. After an exciting first half with chances for both sides, Zhang Yuning broke the deadlock heading in a Bakambu shot that hit the crossbar in the 53rd minute. Yatai leveled the game in the 73rd after a corner situation caused confusion in front of Guoan's goal. In the 83rd minute, Wang Ziming scored what was seemingly the goal that could help Guoan secure the game and celebrated by taking off his shirt, but VAR review ruled the goal offside and he received a yellow card for the celebration. Guoan ramped up its attack and finally took the lead again with Zhang Yuning heading in a cross from a freekick flicked on by Yu Dabao. With the precious 2–1 win, Guoan maintained the hope of qualifying for the champions group in the next stage as the team is one point behind Shanghai Shenhua, the next and last matchday's opponent.   

With champion hopes on the line, Guoan faced rival Shanghai Shenhua on 15 August. Just 6 minutes into the game, Zhang Yuning took advantage of a botched opposition clearance and sliced the ball cleanly into the net. 5 minutes later, Bakambu was fouled in the box and Zhang Xizhe calmly put it past the opposition keeper. In the 16th minute, Wang Gang's pull back cross found Shenhua's defender, who turned in into his own goal for a 3–0 Guoan lead. Shenhua pulled one back during the first half stoppage time, but Zhang Yuning sealed the game in the 81st minute after noticing that he was unmarked in the opposition box. Running onto a Bai Yang pass, Zhang calmly scored Guoan's fourth. With a 4–2 victory, Guoan secured 3rd in qualification stage group A, qualifying for the championship stage.

Guoan announced on 18 August that it has terminated the contract of Fernando after friendly discussion as he was unable to return to China due to the country's strict COVID-19 quarantine regulations. The club and Jonathan Viera negotiated a termination of his contract half a year in advance on 23 August, allowing him to signed for hometown club Las Palmas.

October 
After an extended break and training camps, Guoan returned to play action on 14 October against China League One Sichuan Jiuniu in the first round in the Chinese FA Cup. Wang Ziming opened the scoring in the 29th minute on a Cao Yongjing counter, but Jiuniu equalized in the second half, bringing the game into penalties. Wang Ziming, Liu Huan and Yang Fan all failed to convert, losing Guoan the penalty shootout 2–3.

November 
Anderson Silva joined the team on 2 November after completing quarantine. On 30 November, during the extended break in the China Super League due to national team competitions and Chinese quarantine requirements for people who have traveled abroad, Guoan announced the departure of record goalscorer Cédric Bakambu.

December 
Guoan's league campaign resumed on 13 December against Guangzhou, which Guoan won 1–0 thanks to a Zhang Yuning header from a Gao Tianyi corner in the 83rd minute. 

On 16 December, Guoan played Shandong. Zhang Yuning scored in the 73rd minute after the opposition defender failed to clear a pass from Gao Tianyi, making Zhang the first Chinese player to score in 5 consecutive matches for the club. However, Guoan went on to concede twice before the end of the match, losing 1–2. Wang Gang also suffered a broken right arm during the game that later required hospital operation, sidelining him for games to come.

Guoan's league campaign continued on 19 December against Guangzhou City. Despite a 68-32 advantage in possession throughout the game and having generated 19 shots with 7 on target, Guoan conceded twice in the opening 8 minutes and lost the game 0–5, tying the team's record for worst domestic defeat and setting a new record for the worst league defeat. A day later on 20 December, Li Lei announced his departure to join Grasshopper Club Zürich after the completion of Guoan's season.

On 22 December, Guoan played against Shenzhen. Silva opened the scoring for Guoan after tapping in his own shot that bounced off the post from a Li Lei cross in the 10th minute. Silva also forced Shenzhen's Zhou Xin to commit a foul that saw the latter sent off in the 12th minute, but the man advantage did not last long as Jin Pengxiang received a red card too just six minutes later. Minutes after Guoan conceded, Gao Tianyi threaded a pass to Zhang Yuning, who dribbled past the defender and took the lead for Guoan again in the 70th minute. The lead  did not last to the end, however, with Guoan conceding from a 89th minute Shenzhen corner. The game ended 2–2.

Guoan's woes continued on 26 December with a 0–1 loss to Guangzhou, taking Guoan's winless streak up to four games. On the same matchday, Shandong Taishan claimed the CSL title. Guoan closed out the year with a 1–1 tie against Shandong on 29 December. Silva capitalized on a Shandong mistake in the 17th minute to take the lead, but Guoan was unable to hold on to the lead and conceded in the 28th minute. The match was also Li Lei's last for Guoan before leaving for Grasshopper Zürich.

January 2022 
The last games of the 2021 season were played in early January 2022. Guoan extended its winless streak to 6 games with a 1–1 tie against Guangzhou City on 1 January. Zhang Yuning converted a penalty earned by Silva in the 39th minute to give Guoan the lead before the team conceded an outside-the-box goal.

Guoan's finished the last game of the season against Shenzhen on 4 January with a 1–0 victory. Cao Yongjing missed a penalty he won in the 2nd minute, but scored in the 11th to make up for the mistake. Guoan ended the season fifth in the Chinese Super League. With 10 goals scored, Zhang Yuning ends the season as the joint top Chinese goalscorer.

Players 

 As of 23 August 2021

Transfers

In

Out

Friendlies

Competitions

Overview

Chinese Super League

This season's Chinese Super League was planned to take place in three stages. In the first stage, the 16 participating teams were divided into two groups competing in Guangzhou and Suzhou respectively, with Guoan in group B alongside Shanghai Port, Shanghai Shenhua and Wuhan amongst other teams. Stage one consisted of 14 rounds as teams play each other twice. The top four teams in group A would be joined with the bottom four teams in group B to compete in stage two and vice versa. Teams that did not play against each other in stage one would play each other twice, making for 8 rounds of competition. In stage three, the top four teams of one group would be joined with the bottom four teams of the opposing group; as is with stage two, teams that did not play against each other in stage one would play each other twice for a total of 8 rounds. The leader of the overall standing after three stages and 30 rounds would become crowned as champion.

However on 5 July, the CSL calendar was shortened to 22 matchdays from the original 30. The top four teams from Group A and B respectively after 14 matchdays would qualify for the championship group, which would consist of 8 matchdays as the teams from one group play only the teams from the other group twice. The winner of the championship group would be crowned as champions.

Results summary

Overall

Results by round

Qualification stage

League table

Results by round

Matches

Championship stage

League table

Results by round

Matches

Chinese FA Cup

Guoan will join the FA Cup in the fourth round beginning on 14 October along with 31 other teams. All rounds will be single-elimination except for the quarter-finals and the semi-finals, in which two games will be play between the competing teams.

AFC Champions League

Group stage

Statistics

Appearances and goals

Goals

Assists

Clean sheets

Disciplinary record

Notes

References

2021
Chinese football clubs 2021 season